St John's Kirk, also known as St Winnock's Church and, colloquially, Auld Simon (Old Simon), is a former church building in Lochwinnoch, Renfrewshire, Scotland. It dates 1729, and is now Category B listed. Only the southwest gable and a single bay of the structure remains, the rest likely torn down around the date the new church was constructed in 1808.

The church is surrounded by a walled cemetery, which is also part of the listing.

See also
List of listed buildings in Lochwinnoch, Renfrewshire

References

Churches completed in 1729
Churches in Renfrewshire
Listed churches in Scotland
Former churches in Scotland
Category B listed buildings in Renfrewshire